Darcie Vincent (born March 18, 1970) was the head women's basketball coach at Appalachian State University until 5 September when she resigned as head coach. She previously coached at California University of Pennsylvania, where she coached the Vulcans to a 212-47 record. In 2004, the Vulcans won the Division II National Title with a 35-1 record. She also coached at Slippery Rock University of Pennsylvania for four years where she posted a 52-54 record.

External links
http://www.appstatesports.com/ViewArticle.dbml?DB_LANG=C&DB_OEM_ID=21500&ATCLID=209636234&SPID=12825&SPSID=104530

Appalachian State Mountaineers women's basketball coaches
Living people
1970 births
Place of birth missing (living people)
American women's basketball coaches
Slippery Rock University of Pennsylvania
California University of Pennsylvania faculty